Yeni Həyat is a village and municipality in the Qusar Rayon of Azerbaijan. It has a population of 1,004.  The municipality consists of the villages of Yeni Həyat and Ləngi.

References

Populated places in Qusar District